General Kuznetsov may refer to:

Fyodor Kuznetsov (1898–1961), Soviet Army colonel general
Mikhail Kuznetsov (pilot) (1913–1989), Soviet Air Force major general
Vasily Kuznetsov (general) (1894–1964), Soviet Army colonel general
Yuri Viktorovich Kuznetsov (1946–2020), Russian Airborne Forces major general